Lal Bahadur Shastri International Airport  is an international airport serving Varanasi, Uttar Pradesh, India. Formerly known as Varanasi Airport, it was officially renamed after Lal Bahadur Shastri, the 2nd Prime Minister of India, in October 2005. It is the 20th-busiest airport in India in terms of passenger movement, and the second-busiest airport in Uttar Pradesh. The airport is awarded as the best airport in Asia-Pacific in 2020 (2 to 5 million passengers per annum) by Airports Council International.

Terminal

The terminal features 16 check-in counters with CUTE (common-user terminal equipment), four immigration counters that double up as emigration counters, and two baggage-claim belts. Besides an upper-level seating area for the aero-bridge gates, the terminal features a ground-level gate to reach other aircraft on the apron on foot, or via shuttle bus. The apron can simultaneously park five narrow-body aircraft. The waiting area features essential services for the passengers, besides snack stalls, a travellers' convenience store, a bookstore with a newsstand, and stores selling merchandise indigenous to Varanasi, such as Banarasi Saris; and a VIP waiting lounge.

Airfield
The airport features a single asphalt runway bearing 09/27. It is 9,006 feet (2,745 m) in length, with turnarounds on both ends, and two exits to the main apron. A third, seldom-used exit leads to an isolated apron for use in emergency.

Airlines and destinations

: The flight is operated via a stop at Bangalore.

Statistics

Future plans
An underpass will be constructed as the expansion will intersect with National Highway 31.

In November 2019, the Airports Authority of India came up with a proposal for a new second terminal, which will be completed by 2024. The total area of the terminal will be 58,691 m² with passenger capacity of 4.5 million per year.

See also
 List of airports in India
 List of the busiest airports in India
 Chaudhary Charan Singh International Airport

References

External links

 Varanasi Airport at Airports Authority of India web site

Buildings and structures in Varanasi
Airports in Uttar Pradesh
International airports in India
Transport in Varanasi
Memorials to Lal Bahadur Shastri
Airports with year of establishment missing